Valisere was a lingerie brand of the German underwear company Triumph International.

Valisere – The heritage 
Auguste Perrin founded leather glove manufacturer ‘Grand Perrin’ in 1860, and launched the Valisere line in Grenoble, France in 1913.
Triumph International acquired the brand Valisere in 1991.

History 

1860 – The company ‘ Le Grand Perrin’ is founded by Madame August Perrin and her sons Paul and Férréol

1913 – The brand Valisere goes into operation. The company is located near Val d'Isère, a small town in the valley of Isère in the southeast of France.

1919 – The company, focusing especially on the production of ladies and men's underwear, sees the first lingerie collection (underskirts) born.

1921 – Vertical integration begins and the newly developed ladder-proof (run resistant) fabrics are used extensively for the production of ladies underwear.

1924 – Under the leadership of grandson Paul -Valérien Perrin, the company enjoys a long period of success reflected in an increase in capital from F3,000,000 to F6,000,000.

1935 – Subsidiaries are established in Brazil and Morocco

1940 – François Clement, a nephew of Paul-Valérian Perrin, takes over the company leadership. He is facing dire supply situations but despite all obstacles, he is able to keep the factory running during the difficult war years.

1941 – Licenses are- established in Belgium, the Netherlands and Sweden

1946 – The new fibre Nylon is changing the hosiery and underwear markets. The new technology is allows creation of style with more lace and embroidery designs

1950 – Valisere is the largest employer in Grenoble

1959 – Valisere has 1500 employees and the company is awarded the ‘La Coupe d’Or du Bon gout Français.’

1961 – Paul Valérien Perrin dies and François Clement takes over the leadership of the company together with his brother Georges.

1975 – Turnover of F 200 million and 1200 employees in 9 factories in France

Unfortunately the following 14 years  see a decline of the company and

1980 – The family company with 40 shareholders is finally sold to a finance company

1982 – Back in the black. Business is improving and Dessous are in the spotlight again.

1987 – Valisere is acquired by Ovale, a textile company from Roubaux

1991 – Triumph International AG acquires the brand Valisere

1993 – New brand logo is created and new marketing concepts target a more exclusive consumer group. Valisere exports exclusive, seductive French lingerie.

2005 – Introduction of the segment Valisere Tabu, a new line  of daring design s for the distinct few.

2006 – Valisere goes global. The brand Pour Moi converted into Valisere to strengthen to global approach and to streamline the overall marketing strategy. Implementation of the ‘Berry’ walls at POS.

2009 – Valisere launches their Online [Designer Lingerie] Store

External links 
Valisere lingerie

Lingerie brands